Maximilien Van Haaster (born June 19, 1992) is a male foil fencer from Canada. He won the bronze medal at the 2013 Pan American Fencing Championships in Cartagena, and later competed at the 2015 Pan American Games, in Toronto, Ontario.

Career
Van Haaster qualified to represent his country at the 2016 Summer Olympics, by being ranked in the top two in the Americas. At the games, Van Haaster finished in 31st place. Van Haaster competed at the 2020 Summer Olympics in the men's individual and team events.

See also
List of Canadian sports personalities

References

External links
 

1992 births
Living people
Canadian male foil fencers
Fencers from Montreal
Fencers at the 2015 Pan American Games
Fencers at the 2016 Summer Olympics
Olympic fencers of Canada
Fencers at the 2019 Pan American Games
Pan American Games medalists in fencing
Pan American Games bronze medalists for Canada
Medalists at the 2019 Pan American Games
Fencers at the 2020 Summer Olympics